State Road 445 (SR 445) is a short connector route, just  long, in eastern Greene County, just north of the small town of Cincinnati. It connects SR 54, SR 45, and I-69 (Exit 104).

Route description
SR 445 begins at SR 54 with a flashing light, near the Greene County Inn (also a cafe). It then runs east to a four-way intersection where it meets SR 45. It then continues east, ending at its eastern terminus at exit 104 on Interstate 69 (I-69).

History
SR 445's original eastern terminus was a stop sign with SR 45. On December 9, 2015, I-69 opened, and SR 445 was extended east to I-69 Exit 104.

Major intersections

References

External links

445
Transportation in Greene County, Indiana